Antonio Andonis Foti (born 3 November 2003) is a professional footballer currently playing as a midfielder for Hannover 96, on loan from Eintracht Frankfurt. Born in Bulgaria, he represents Cyprus at youth level.

Club career
Born in Varna, Bulgaria, Foti started his career with Cherno More, before moving to Cyprus in 2017 to sign for Omonia.

Before and after just turning 16 years old, and specifically between 12 September and 31 December 2019, he spent the first half of the 2019–20 season out on loan to Cypriot Third Division club Ormideia FC, scoring five times in twelve senior first-team appearances.

After offers from Fiorentina and Wolverhampton Wanderers, Foti moved to Germany to join Bundesliga club Eintracht Frankfurt in January 2020. His career in Frankfurt got off to a great start, with Foti notably scoring 14 goals in 16 under-19 appearances at the beginning of the 2021–22 season. As a result of his stellar form, Foti signed a new contract with the German club in January 2022.

On 16 June 2022, Foti was loaned out to Hannover 96 in the 2. Bundesliga for two seasons.

International career
Having represented Bulgaria at youth international level, Foti switched his allegiance to Cyprus, the country of his father.

Personal life
Antonio is the brother of fellow footballer Hristian Foti.

Career statistics

Club

Notes

References

2003 births
Living people
Sportspeople from Varna, Bulgaria
Cypriot footballers
Cyprus youth international footballers
Bulgarian footballers
Bulgaria youth international footballers
Cypriot people of Bulgarian descent
Bulgarian people of Greek Cypriot descent
Association football midfielders
2. Bundesliga players
Regionalliga players
PFC Cherno More Varna players
AC Omonia players
Eintracht Frankfurt players
Hannover 96 players
Cypriot expatriate footballers
Cypriot expatriate sportspeople in Germany
Bulgarian expatriate footballers
Bulgarian expatriate sportspeople in Germany
Expatriate footballers in Germany